This is a list of the National Register of Historic Places listings in Yosemite National Park.

This is intended to be a complete list of the properties and districts on the National Register of Historic Places in Yosemite National Park, California, United States.  The locations of National Register properties and districts for which the latitude and longitude coordinates are included below, may be seen in a Google map.

There are 46 properties and districts listed on the National Register in the park and five National Historic Landmarks. Four more properties associated with the park are located just outside the park boundaries.

Current listings 

|}

Associated properties 
The following properties are on property owned by the National Park Service and administered by Yosemite National Park, but are not within the park proper:

|}

See also 
 National Register of Historic Places listings in Mariposa County, California
 National Register of Historic Places listings in Tuolumne County, California
 National Register of Historic Places listings in California

References

External links

Y01